San Diego Hall of Fame may refer to:
Breitbard Hall of Fame, general sports hall of fame in San Diego, California
San Diego Chargers Hall of Fame, American football hall of fame of the local NFL franchise in San Diego, California
San Diego Padres Hall of Fame, baseball hall of fame of the local MLB franchise in San Diego, California
Aztec Hall of Fame, sports hall of fame of San Diego State University